The Dv12 (Sv12 and Sr12 until 1977) is the standard Finnish medium-weight diesel-hydraulic road switcher operated by VR. As all the main lines of Finnish railway network have been electrificied, the locomotive is designated mostly to unelectrified, less frequently used side lines. Occasionally it may still pull cargo trains on main lines. It has also been put in service as a shunter, replacing older classes Dv15 and Dv16 as they were retired. A total of 192 locomotives were built by Lokomo and Valmet between the years 1963 and 1984. As of 2022, the oldest Dv12 units still in use are 59 years old.

Technical information 

The Dv12 is a general purpose locomotive which was designed for both passenger and cargo train use. Its 1000 kW power is somewhat low by current standards, but it is capable of multiple-unit operation with only one train crew and doublets and triplets are common. It has a low axle load of 15.6 tonnes, which makes it very well suited for branch lines that allow only smaller axle loads. All the axles are interconnected with shafts and universal joints to the Voith L 216 rs hydraulic transmission. Because all axles must rotate at the same speed, the individual slipping of axles is impossible. This translates into a very good tractive effort for a 62 tonne locomotive. The main engine is a Finnish-built Tampella SACM MGO V16 BSHR Diesel with two Brown Boveri-VTR 200 M turbochargers.

This mechanical gear can only be switched with the locomotive at standstill.

Variants

Sr12
Between 1965 and 1972, 60 slightly heavier variants of the Sv12 were built. These were assimilated in the same series when their nomenclature changed to Dv12.

Sv1
Dv12 number 2501 was modified between 1978 and 1980 to run on electricity instead of diesel, becoming class Sv1 number 3201. The locomotive was used first in freight traffic, later in passenger trains between Helsinki and Imatra. The Sv1 was used to test three-phase alternating current electrical engines; the results were used when developing class Dr16. The electrical components were delivered by Strömberg, which was also involved in the Dr16 project. The locomotive was painted yellow with black stripes, a colour scheme known from another short-lived prototype, the Dr15.

In 1984, after four years of testing, the Sv1 was refitted with a diesel engine, returning to its original nomenclature and number. Number 3201 is nowadays used on an Sr2 class locomotive. Dv12 number 2501 is currently, in 2019, still in use.

Retirement and future development 
In 2009, VR abandoned some of the older units of 2700 series Dv12s. The company plans to purchase new diesel locomotives during the 2010s.

References

Literature
 
 
 Arttu Käyhkö: Deeverin matkassa Kustantaja Laaksonen, Otavan kirjapaino Keuruu 2015

External links

Dv12
Dv12
Dv12
B-B locomotives
Railway locomotives introduced in 1963
5 ft gauge locomotives